Fast food is mass-produced food that can be prepared and served quickly.

Fast food may also refer to:

Fast Food (1989 film), an American film
Fast Food (1999 film), a British film
Fast Food (1982 video game), a 1982 video game for the Atari 2600
Fast Food (1989 video game), a 1989 video game in the Dizzy franchise
Fast Food, a 2015 album by Nadine Shah